Greg Laswell (born April 26, 1974) is an American musician, recording engineer, and record producer from San Diego, California. He attended high school at Valley Christian High School in Cerritos, California. He has released 7 studio albums: Good Movie in 2003, Through Toledo in 2006, Three Flights from Alto Nido in 2008, Take a Bow in 2010, Landline in 2012, I Was Going to be an Astronaut in 2014, Everyone Thinks I Dodged A Bullet in 2016, and Next Time in 2018, as well as several EPs and special singles. Many of his songs have been featured in films and television shows.

Career

1998–2002: Shillglen
Greg Laswell was born in Long Beach, California. He moved to San Diego in 1993 and graduated from Point Loma Nazarene University. From 1998 through the early 2000s, Laswell was frontman for the San Diego-based band Shillglen. Members of the band included Chad Lansford (backing vocals and guitar), Justin Skeesuck (guitar), Michael de Neve (bass), Marcel de Neve (drums) and Matt Mintz (lead guitar). The band released one album, titled Sometimes I Feel, in late 1999 and had some moderate success when the band was nominated for Best Alternative Album and Best Alternative Band at the San Diego Music Awards in 2000. By mid-2001, Shillglen had over 400,000 downloads of their music through MP3.com. However, Shillglen quietly disbanded in October 2001 after Laswell suggested the band take a break. The band mutually agreed, but never regrouped.

2003–2006: Good Movie and Through Toledo
Laswell released his first solo album Good Movie in 2003. It was self-funded and self-released on his own label All the Rest Records, and won the award for Best Local Recording by the San Diego Music Awards in 2004. Following the album's success, Laswell signed to Vanguard Records, and then recorded and released his second studio album Through Toledo in July 2006. The album was written during Laswell's divorce from his wife; he stated: "It's basically a breakup album...but the biggest surprise has been when you resurface out of the dark little studio. On this tour, people have been coming up to me and telling me about what they've been going through. It has nothing to do with anything that I originally wrote about. So it's become a full circle, healing thing. I'm just lucky to be in the loop."

2008–2009: How the Day Sounds, Three Flights from Alto Nido, and Covers
In spring 2008, Laswell joined the European leg of the Hotel Cafe Tour, hosted by Tom McRae. He released an EP titled How the Day Sounds in March 2008, which preceded his third studio album Three Flights from Alto Nido, released in July. Several songs from the album, including "Comes and Goes (In Waves)", "How the Day Sounds" (which features Elijah Wood in the music video), "Sweet Dream", and "And Then You" have been featured in the television shows like Grey's Anatomy, True Blood, Castle, 90210, Army Wives and Dollhouse. "And Then You" was also used in the award-winning feature film Where We're Meant to Be. Laswell's single "Off I Go" was written specially for the season 5 finale of Grey's Anatomy.  It was also featured on NBC's Parenthood. Laswell also contributed his cover of Cyndi Lauper's hit "Girls Just Wanna Have Fun" to the soundtrack for both Confessions of a Shopaholic in early 2009; and to the soundtrack for My Sister's Keeper, also in 2009.

In September 2008, How the Day Sounds won the Best Music Video award at the San Diego Film Festival.

In October 2009, Laswell released a new EP entitled Covers featuring five cover songs.

2010–2012: Take a Bow and Landline
Laswell released a new full album, "Take a Bow" on May 4, 2010. All 12 new tracks were recorded in a studio in a cabin outside Flagstaff, AZ. "Perhaps the biggest difference with this album", observes Greg Laswell of his new Take A Bow, "is that I'm not miserable." Laswell also chimes in on the album stating, "I could not be more excited about how it turned out. Greg Laswell also says that after his Solo Residency Tour wraps up, a full-band tour will commence in May, in support of this new release.

He has toured with several artists over the years, including Matt Costa, Sia, Tim O'Reagan of The Jayhawks and Amy Millan of Stars. Laswell has also scored several short films, including Longbranch: A Suburban Parable in 2001; Deacon's Mondays in 2006.

Laswell's fifth studio album, titled "Landline", was released on April 24, 2012.

2013–2017: I Was Going to be an Astronaut and Everyone Thinks I Dodged A Bullet
In 2014, Laswell released his sixth studio album, I was Going to be an Astronaut, which involved remakes of many of his more popular songs, as well as a cover of Sparklehorse's It's a Wonderful Life and a new song, December, which he had cut from a previous record.

In 2016, Laswell released Everyone Thinks I Dodged A Bullet, his seventh studio album. It was featured in NBC's The Blacklist during the credits of the last episode of season 3.

2018–present: Next Time and Covers II
In February 2018, Laswell released his latest song called "What Do I Know?" on his YouTube page.

In August 2018, Laswell released "Royal Empress", the second single from his new studio album. In September 2018, he released his full eighth studio album, Next Time.

In September 2019, Laswell released his second album of cover songs, Covers II. The album featured covers of obscure songs by PJ Harvey and The Psychedelic Furs, as well as "Lucky Man" by The Verve.

Personal life

In early 2010, Laswell and fellow artist Ingrid Michaelson were engaged. They were married on August 10, 2011, in Maine. On February 27, 2015, following a rough year both physically and emotionally for Michaelson, the couple announced they were mutually splitting. A joint statement released by Michaelson and Laswell reads: "After careful consideration, and with mutual respect, we have decided to separate. We ask for privacy as we navigate this time in our lives."

Discography
See: Greg Laswell discography

Song appearances in films and television shows
From Through Toledo
 "Sing, Theresa Says"
 One Tree Hill, January 2007
 Cold Case, October 2007
 "High and Low"
 Without a Trace, October 2006
 Smallville, January 2007
 "Come Undone"
 Veronika Decides to Die promotional trailer, May 2009
 Friday Night Lights commercial, September 2009

From Three Flights from Alto Nido
 "Comes and Goes (In Waves)"
 True Blood, October 2008
 Grey's Anatomy, October 2008
 Taking Chance promotional trailer, January 2009
 "How the Day Sounds"
 Army Wives, July 2007
 90210, September 2008
 The Final Destination, August 2009
 Sisters, December 2015
 "And Then You"
 Grey's Anatomy, September 2008.
 Arrow, April 2014. Season 2 Episode 20
 Where We're Meant to Be, July 2017
 "Days Go On"
 Grey's Anatomy, October 2008
 "Sweet Dream"
 Dollhouse, March 2009
 Parenthood, April 2011

From Take a Bow
 "Goodbye"
 The Hills, May 2010
 Grey's Anatomy, October 2010
 "Take a Bow"
 Parenthood, September 2010
 Friends with Benefits, July 2011
 "Let It Ride"
 Life Unexpected, October 2010
 "Come Clean"
 Wentworth, July 2014

From Everyone Think's I Dodged a Bullet
 "Dodged a Bullet"
 The Blacklist, May 2016

From Covers 2
 "Love My Way"
 Station 19, May 2020

Non-album tracks
 "What a Day"
 Danika, December 2006
 Numb3rs, May 2007
 Canterbury's Law, March 2008
 Grey's Anatomy, April 2008
 CSI: Miami, October 2009
 Beauty & the Beast (2012 TV series), January 2014
 "Girls Just Wanna Have Fun"
 The Hills, 2007
 Damages, 2008
 Confessions of a Shopaholic, February 2009
 My Sister's Keeper, June 2009
 Glee, November 2011
 The Carrie Diaries, January 2013
 Suburgatory, March 2013
 In the Dark (American TV series), May 2019
 "Off I Go"
 Grey's Anatomy, May 2009
 House M.D.
 NCIS, September 2010
 One Tree Hill, October 2010
 Parenthood, February 2011
 "Your Ghost"
 Ghost Whisperer, September 2006
 Grey's Anatomy, October 2009
 Dollhouse, December 2009
 Verbotene Liebe, 2010
 "This Woman's Work"
 Three Rivers, November 2009
 The Vampire Diaries, October 2011
 "In Spite of Me"
 Grey's Anatomy, November 2009
 "What Goes On" (Velvet Underground cover)
 What Goes On, 2007

Awards and nominations

San Diego Music Awards

|-
| rowspan="2" | 2000 || Shillglen || Best Alternative Band || 
|-
| Sometimes I Feel || Best Alternative Album || 
|-
| 2004 || Good Movie || Best Local Recording || 
|-
| 2006 || Greg Laswell || Best Alternative Artist || 
|-
| rowspan="2" | 2007 || Through Toledo || Album of the Year || 
|-
| "Sing, Theresa Says" || Song of the Year || 
|-
| 2008 || Greg Laswell || Artist of the Year ||

References

External links
 Official website 
 Greg Laswell on YouTube
 
 Greg Laswell on Apple.com
 

American male singer-songwriters
American rock songwriters
American rock singers
Point Loma Nazarene University alumni
Living people
1974 births
Musicians from Long Beach, California
American folk rock musicians
American indie rock musicians
21st-century American musicians
Singer-songwriters from California
21st-century American singers
21st-century American male singers